In the Anita Blake: Vampire Hunter series of novels, author Laurell K. Hamilton has developed a detailed mythology.  Her series is an alternate historyin which the supernatural is real, and vampires, lycanthropes, and other supernatural beings live alongside humans in a society that otherwise resembles 21st century North America.

Although the existence of supernatural beings has been public knowledge for centuries in the Anitaverse (see select references below), its history has otherwise unfolded so identically to that of the real world that the series contains occasional references to the popular culture of the 1990s, including the Teenage Mutant Ninja Turtles, the O. J. Simpson trial, and others.

Undead

Vampires

There are many different types of vampires discussed in Anita Blake's mythology. Generally they are turned by being bitten three times on three subsequent nights. Draining of blood is part of the process, although not all of it as not everyone who is bitten becomes a vampire and the full requirements to go from being human to vampire are uncertain. Once turned the new vampire is then taught by their master on the rights, rituals and general rules of "living," which includes a blood oath between the master and subservient vampire (read: does not necessarily require a newly turned individual). This generally in turn leads to the vampire hierarchy of master to Master of the City. These master vampires in turn owe their allegiance to the top of the vampire hierarchy the Vampire Council. Also included are feral vampires who have either been without blood, tortured and subjected to holy items for too long. Once a feral state, the vampire loses its ability to reason and only becomes obsessed with feeding. When this state is reached by a vampire, it is nearly impossible to reverse or control without being destroyed. Anita managed to bring Damian back from this state by taking his blood 
oath.

Vampire characteristics
The only real universal trait is that they are blood drinking reanimated human corpses, risen from the dead to prey on the living, with a variety of diverse supernatural powers which grow stronger with each passing year; 
Immortality. Being animated by supernatural forces which preserve their souls within their unliving cadavers, vampires neither age nor decay; and although they can starve, they cannot starve to death. They are also extremely difficult to harm; wounds from most objects, even bullets, heal in seconds without causing them any seeming discomfort and their unliving nature combined with their preternatural vitality renders them immune to all terrestrial diseases and other biological afflictions. Impaired or disabled humans or those suffering from a debilitating or terminal illness will find their faculties and health fully restored and improved several-fold upon reanimation as a vampire.
Superhuman Physical Attributes. A key characteristic which distinguishes vampires from humans and even other undead is their supernaturally augmented bodies. Their strength is superhuman; able to lift average-sized cars and injure humans with ease, and they move with incredible celerity. Vampires slowly and subtly grow stronger both in physical prowess as well as psychic potency with age; those with several centuries of undeath can send grown men flying across a room with the slightest touch, accidentally kill a human with a backhanded slap, eviscerate giant animals, and move with such speed that they appear to teleport.    
Heightened Senses. Their senses are heightened to the point were they can tell a human's emotional state by scent alone, see in the dark, or hear whispered comments from some distance away.   
Rolling. Vampires can "roll" victims by making eye contact. "Rolling" typically refers to a temporary hypnotic state that vampires can use to conceal their movements (giving them the illusion of instantaneous movement or teleportation), to give commands to the victim, or to reduce the pain of a vampire's bite. Victims with supernatural power, such as other vampires, animators, human servants, and lycanthropes, display varying amounts of resistance to this technique due to their own innate paranormal natures, but most people avoid the technique by not looking vampires directly in the eyes. A victim never remembers rolling, usually have this vague memory of eyes, or sometimes an animal with blazing eyes, or car headlights that were very bright, and after that is black-out, a gap in memory. A skilled hypnotist is usually able to recover lost memory.
Deep Rolling. Given time, a sufficiently powerful vampire can put a victim into an effectively permanent hypnotic state. In Guilty Pleasures, Aubrey uses this technique on Anita's friend Catherine in order to blackmail Anita—Anita knows that once deeply rolled, Catherine is Aubrey's to command unless Anita meets his demands. Vampires sometimes pretend to release a rolled human to appease the police, but if they have been "deep rolled" they can still recall them. Only the death of either the vampire or the human will severe the psychic link. 
Mass Hypnosis. Some vampires are able to exert a hypnotic effect over an entire crowd. For example, one of the vampire comedians at the Laughing Corpse used mass hypnosis to convince his audiences that he was funny. Mass hypnosis does not have the same permanent effects as "deep rolling". Mass hypnosis is not a widely known vampire power, and has its limits. For example, in Bloody Bones, Anita doubts that any vampire could hold three murder victims simultaneously hypnotized while killing them. This form of "mind control" is the only one currently considered legal.
Vampire's Bite. A vampire's bite can (but apparently does not always) provide the vampire with mental control over the victim. In Guilty Pleasures, Nikolaos bites Anita and states that after a few bites, her control over Anita will be absolute. Anita is able to remove the effect of the bite by disinfecting the wound with holy water. In Circus of the Damned, Anita states that a vampire must enter a victim's mind during a bite to gain control over the victim. A vampire's bite can be intimate and sexually pleasurable depending on the victim's feelings towards the vampire and the use of mind powers, and the act of feeding itself is often seen as a form of intimacy in addition to or even in lieu of sex for both parties.
Empathy. Vampires refer to being able to "smell" emotions such as fear and lust through their heightened senses, and some vampires are able to detect lies. It is not clear precisely how much of this ability involves literal scent and how much involves mental powers. However, mental powers are clearly a significant component; once Jean-Claude makes Anita his human servant, he is unable to read her emotions, which suggests that the technique is not purely physical. Thanks to Itzpapalotl Anita on occasion can obtain vampire sharpened vision for a while; this sharpened vision alone is enough to notice other person's emotional state and detect a lie, or to notice slightest details, like well-hidden weapons.
Vulnerabilities. They are vulnerable to fire or wounds to the heart caused by wooden or silver weapons. They dislike garlic, can be repelled by religious icons wielded by people with faith, and are burned by holy water and sunlight. Wounds caused by silver or holy water will heal at a human rate and leave scars. They cannot enter a person's home unless they are invited; if the invitation is rescinded, the vampire is barred from the property by an unseen force.

Zombies
Zombies are mindless humans or animals raised from the dead by an animator, a vaundun practitioner, or a necromancer.  Although they may appear human and have some of their memories at first, zombies quickly lose their memories and begin to rot.  Zombies do not need to eat, but if fed meat, zombies will rot more slowly or not at all.

Although not supernaturally strong, zombies are able to use their entire strength without concern for exhaustion or damage.  They typically obey their creator's orders absolutely.  Zombies are able to operate in daylight, but prefer night, and will hide during the day if permitted.
 
If an animator's corpse is raised as a zombie, it will arise as a flesh-eating zombie—uncontrollable, much faster than a normal zombie, and with a taste for human flesh.  The zombie can only regain its memory and personality by eating human flesh.

In another instance, if the victim of a murder is risen as a zombie, the zombie will rise and then actively seek out its murderer. The zombie will then kill the murderer after attacking anything that has gotten in its way. Such a zombie can not be controlled like other zombies, which is clear from the short story Those Who Seek Forgiveness and from the novel Micah. The latter source shows that physical act of killing is irrelevant; causing person's death on purpose creates a murder victim.

Vaundun priestess Dominga Salvador created two apparently novel types of zombies.

 Salvador was capable of storing the soul of a dead person in a bottle, allowing her to raise zombies before their souls had passed on.  By returning the soul to the zombie, Salvador created zombies with souls.  This process prevented the zombies from rotting while they had souls, and served as further punishment for the deceased.
 Salvador also created a sort of zombie chimera by animating parts of several humans and animals, then melding them into a single monstrous zombie.  A version of this type of zombie is also seen in Obsidian Butterfly.

Ghosts
Anita has encountered ghosts before.  According to her, ghosts cannot actually harm a living person, but paying attention to them allows them to become more solid and attempt to harass or scare their victims.  Anita generally tries to avoid animating a corpse if the deceased person's ghost is still haunting their grave.  She appears to have no power over them, as ghosts are a type of "soul magic," as noted in The Laughing Corpse. As yet, no clear information on their legal status in the Anitaverse has been revealed.

In Crimson Death lack of dead bodies to raise forces Anita to raise crowd of vengeful, angry ghosts; to make them more solid, Anita gave them blood; probably she shared some of her power with them, so ghosts were able to kill vampires.

Ghouls
Ghouls are undead scavengers, who hunt in packs, typically near the cemetery where they live, feed on human corpses and living human flesh. Ghouls have animal or child-level intelligence and typically haunt cemeteries that are no longer holy ground, either because of the passage of time or because of some unholy ritual. Ghouls regard non-ghouls as either potential food or something to run from.  As yet, animators in the Anitaverse do not know why most ghouls rise from the dead, although in one case, a pack of ghouls apparently rose when Zachary, an animator, was buried and rose from the dead. The female form is given as ghouleh and the plural is given ghilan.

In Dead Ice Anita is surprised by her power working on ghouls; a ghoul took simple orders from her.

Shapeshifters

Numerous different types of shapeshifters exist in the Anita Blake: Vampire Hunter universe, including werewolves and wererats.  Anita distinguishes between lycanthropes, which includes solely persons infected by contact with another lycanthrope's bodily fluids, and shapeshifters, a class that includes both lycanthropes and persons who are able to shapeshift as a result of magic, such as a personal or family curse.

Other supernatural creatures
Anita meets or discusses a variety of other supernatural creatures over the course of the novels.

Faeries
Classified as Homo arcanus rather than Homo sapiens, the fey of the Anitaverse share many similarities with those of Hamilton's later Merry Gentry series of novels.

Fey characteristics
 Fey are cross-fertile with humans.  Humans with part fey ancestry, such as Magnus and Dorcas Bouvier may share some characteristics of full blooded fey.  (Because the only fey to appear in the books living in America are the Bouviers and three exotic specimens, Rawhead and Bloody Bones, Xavier and Nuckelavee, this section primarily discusses part-blooded fey descended from the fairy high court, such as the Bouviers).
 Part-fey such as the Bouviers appear primarily human.  In the case of the Bouviers, their most striking physical characteristics are their otherworldly androgynous beauty, and the ability of their irises to "pinwheel" closed when their powers are active.
 Physical abilities: All fey seen in the Anita Blake novels to date have been preternaturally fast and strong, and unusually resistant to damage.  Some fullblooded fey, such as Rawhead, are completely immortal under normal conditions.  (Ultimately, Rawhead shared blood with Magnus, rendering Rawhead capable of being killed while Magnus lived).
 Cold iron:  Unlike vampires and lycanthropes, fey are not bothered by silver.  Cold forged iron or even lead is more damaging to them. 
 Glamour: One of the key abilities of the high court fey is that of glamour, an ability to cast illusions.  Humans can resist glamour by placing a variety of magic ointments over their eyes *Example of Glamour; Making mud look and taste like ham.
 Sensitivity: Both Magnus and Dorcas were mentally powerful as well, possessing psychic abilities, such as clairvoyance.
 Harmony with nature: When Anita walked through the forest with Dorcas, it appeared as if the forest plants moved aside for her, or that she was in harmony with them.  (Anita never saw a plant move, but somehow, forest plants were never wherever Dorcas happened to walk.)
 Vampirism: Supposedly, it is impossible to raise a member of the fey as a vampire.  However, as Xavier showed, this does not appear to be entirely true.

Fey social organization
 In the Anitaverse, Unseelie fey are barred by law from immigrating into the United States.  
 The Daoine Sidhe, or fairy high court, is composed of some of the most powerful of the fey.  When Anita sees Magnus using glamour, she concludes that he must be descended from the Daoine Sidhe.  It is divided into a seelie court of neutral or good fey and an unseelie court of "bad" fey.
 Many people in the Anitaverse have partial fey heritage, and, at least in the U.S., they officially have the same rights and privileges as ordinary humans. Even Dolph Storr, who regards most supernatural beings with some dubiousness, considers having fey blood a non-issue. In practice, however, prejudice against part-fey is prevalent enough that many conceal their heritage.

Trolls

Lesser Smokey mountain troll
A small North American species, usually between three and a half feet to around five feet tall.  Diet consists mostly of plants but occasionally carrion or insects.  They walk as humans do, the only other primate species to do so, and are covered in black colored "fur."  They are also what Richard has studied for four years in order to obtain his master's degree.

Greater Smokey mountain troll
A large aggressive and carnivorous species of troll, ranging from eight to twelve feet tall.  They were hunted to extinction, because they had been fond of pulling trees up by their roots, beating people to death with them, and then eating the marrow out of their bones.

North American cave troll
The smallest troll species on North America, one member of the species (named Peter) was attempted to be converted into Christianity, by a human named Simon Barkley.  A scientific journal in 1910 had been published with the information that some trolls had buried their dead with personal artifacts.  The newspapers expanded on that information, proclaiming that the trolls mentioned must believe in an afterlife.  Simon Barkley wrote a book describing his time with Peter and a professor of Anita's had a picture of Peter looking like he was praying.

Dragons
Dragons are known to have existed in the Anita Blake novels, as seen on page 544 of Obsidian Butterfly. However, it implies that most species, if not all, are extinct in present times.

Gargoyles
In The Lunatic Cafe, page 55, gargoyles are described as carrion eaters with the nearest grouping located in Kentucky.  It is possible that they will attack a man, but it happens rarely.  In France, there are three species reported that are either bigger than a human or human sized.

Quetzalcoatl
The status of the supposedly extinct Quetzalcoatl Draconus Giganticus, shortened to Quetzalcoatl, is up for debate, called either a subspecies of dragons or gargoyles or sometimes a class of their own. The Spanish were believed to have hunted them to extinction in their conquest of the Aztecs; however, a living example is seen in Obsidian Butterfly, so this classification may be incorrect. There is a deceased Quetzalcoatl in the Chicago Field Museum, though it is thought a far cry from the living thing.

The Quetzalcoatl is an iridescent green/blue which, as it nears the snout, loses most of the green, with a white belly and underside of wings. Multihued feathers fringe its round eyes, which are compared to that of a bird of prey's, and its wings are the same rainbow of colors as the feathers. It is armed with rows of saw-like teeth and claws. Anita describes it as "one of the most beautiful things [she had] ever seen."

First seen in Obsidian Butterfly, the Quetzalcoatl featured is a servant of the Red Woman's Husband, devouring human flesh given to it by its master. After the Red Woman's Husband's death, it disappeared without a trace and has so far not been mentioned.

Demons
Although rarely encountered in the novels, demons also exist in the Anitaverse; little has been revealed about them to date save that they are vastly powerful and evil entities, apparently residing in an otherworldly dimension and visiting Earth only when summoned by magic or when possessing weak willed humans (with mental illness seen as a potential risk factor for possession). Prior to Anita's own encounter with a demon in Blue Moon, there had been no known direct demon attacks upon humans since the Middle Ages. Devils, also known as "greater demons," are even rarer and considered among the most dangerous creatures in existence; when, in Obsidian Butterfly, Edward suggests that a Devil might be responsible for the mutilations and murders, Anita initially half-believes him to be joking.

Merfolk
Mermaids (and their male counterparts) exist within the Anitaverse.  Merfolk with a power similar to the ardeur are known as sirens who seductively lure men into inhumanly strange but intensely pleasurable sexual unions, only to drown or kill them in some other way.  Sirens have the power to "roll" the minds of people in a similar fashion to vampires.  Due to their potential power over other merfolk, sirens are traditionally slain by merfolk before they can become a danger.

Master Vampire of the City of Cape Cod Samuel has merfolk as his animal to call, and his wife Leucothea is the last living siren.

Humans
Humans are very prominent in the Anitaverse. Anita has many human friends, most of whom are on the police force. Humans by nature don't have any special powers, and are not nearly as strong as most of the preternatural creatures in the books. However, some, like Blake, and her fellow animators, are born with talents that, if developed, enables them to rival or surpass other more powerful creatures. In addition, those who serve vampire masters acquire powers through that service: see the section below on human servants.

Psychics
Psychics are humans that are born with different types of preternatural abilities, so it is debatable whether they are truly human or not. Some psychic abilities include:
Clairvoyance; the bearer of the power can touch a random object and can tell who else has touched it, and what they did with that object. Can be used to find murderers, or where the murder victim is.
Telepathy; telepaths can read minds, and although Anita has not met a telepath, she briefly mentions them in the series. 
 
Although psychic abilities may be very prominent, some people don't even know they're psychic. 
For example, Zerbrowski, one of Anita's police friends, is said to be a little psychic. 
When a vampire's power is floating around the room, Anita is said to have seen Zerbrowski shiver, and none of the other police officers.

Animators
Animators are said to be very rare, though not as rare as necromancers. There are three animating firms in the US according to Anita, and the firm she works for, Animators Inc., has about 6 different animators working there. Animators are born with their powers, and Anita is not sure she was ever human, even from birth. Animators have the ability resist vampires' hypnotic powers to some degree and to raise and control zombies. However, they can only control zombies, while necromancers (like Anita) can control all types of dead, and most undead.

Necromancers
Anita is primarily a necromancer, which gives her the ability to control the dead. They can raise zombies easier than animators, and sometimes don't even need an animal sacrifice. They can also control vampires. In the daytime, they can animate a vampires corpse, whilst it is soulless. Towards the last few books Anita can also control vampires while they are alive, in daytime. Necromancers, as a Vampire's human servant, add greatly to the creation of a power triad, called a triumvirate. A triumvirate includes master vampire, a human servant, and an animal servant.  When a triumvirate includes a necromancer as human servant and a lycanthrope as animal servant, the necromancer may act as the bridge between the vampire and the lycanthrope, since a necromancer is a living being (like lycanthrope) and possesses death magic (like a vampire).

Human Servants
Human servants are bound to a master vampire by a magic called marks. There are four types of mark needed; the first is a kind of extension of the vampires' life force that allows their servant to heal more rapidly and gives them some resistance to vampiric hypnosis, the second comes in a vision of flame and allows the vampire to feed on the metabolism of their servant (when the servant eats/drinks the vampire shares the experience), the third mark involves the vampire feeding from their servant directly allowing the sharing of thoughts and memories between the two, and when the servant is forever bound by the fourth (final) mark which involves the servant drinking the vampires' blood, he/she becomes immortal. The relationship between a vampire and his or her human servant(s) is described as an intimate and eternal union of their flesh, blood, and souls. The human servant should only die when the vampire they are bound to dies, although Anita has proven that wrong on several occasions, in the third book Anita lives on as she kills the vampire she is bound to. Also, if the human servant is killed, due to physical or metaphysical force (although they cannot be poisoned or infected with a pathogen), the vampire they are tied to may die as well, unless that vampire is a sufficiently powerful master, such as Asher or Nikolaos.

Anita Blake: Vampire Hunter
Zombies and revenants in popular culture